Ashbrook is a surname, and may refer to:

 Dana Ashbrook (born 1967), American actor
 Daphne Ashbrook (born 1963), American actress
 Frank G. Ashbrook (1892–1966), American mammalogist
 Jean Spencer Ashbrook (born 1934), American politician, spouse of John
 John M. Ashbrook (1928–1982), American politician, spouse of Jean
 Joseph Ashbrook (1918–1980), American astronomer
 Larry Gene Ashbrook (1952–1999), American mass murderer
 Sharon Ashbrook, British chemist
 Stanley Bryan Ashbrook (1882–1958), American philatelist
 Stephen Ashbrook (born 1969), American singer-songwriter
 Tom Ashbrook (born 1956), American journalist
 Temple Ashbrook (1896–1976), American sailor
 William A. Ashbrook (1867–1940), American businessman and politician
 William Ashbrook (1922–2009), American musicologist, writer, journalist, and academic
 William Ashbrook Kellerman (1850–1908), American botanist, mycologist, and photographer

See also
 Viscount Ashbrook, a title in the Peerage of Ireland.
 Ashbrook (crater)
 Ellis Ashbrook, American rock group